Gilyard is a surname. Notable people with the surname include:

Clarence Gilyard (1955-2022), American actor and college professor
Jacob Gilyard (born 1998), American basketball player
Keith Gilyard (born 1952), prominent American professor of English
 Kevin Gilyard (born 1986), American rapper known professionally as Kevin Gates
Lorenzo Gilyard (born 1950), American serial killer
Mardy Gilyard (born 1986), American football wide receiver